The Turks & Caicos Islands national rugby union team represents the Turks and Caicos Islands in rugby union. Although not an official member of World Rugby; they have been competing in the NACRA Rugby Championship since 2013 and are affiliated with NACRA.

History
Before the Turks & Caicos Islands Rugby Football Union was formed in 2001, the Turks & Caicos Islands national rugby union team made frequent tours in the 1990s. They played other teams in the Caribbeans and participated in a few tournaments.

In 2013 they were invited to the 2013 NACRA Rugby Championship. However, they lost to  13 – 31.

Record

Overall

See also 
 Rugby union in the Turks and Caicos Islands

References

External links 
 

Caribbean national rugby union teams
Rugby union in the Turks and Caicos Islands
2001 establishments in the Turks and Caicos Islands
R